The Audacious Project is a collaborative funding initiative between TED and non-profits that convenes funders and social entrepreneurs in order to scale solutions to the world's most urgent challenges. In 2018, The TED Prize was recast as The Audacious Project.

Details
The TED Prize was a prize commissioned by the American media organization TED Conferences. It ran from 2005 to 2017, culminating in a prize amount of $1 million. In 2018, The TED Prize was recast as The Audacious Project.

TED described the change as:

a new model to launch big, inspiring ideas with the potential to affect millions of lives. Housed at TED, the Audacious Project brings together a powerful coalition of nonprofit organizations and individual donors with members of the public, allowing them to pool resources and work together in service of change-making ideas. An ambitious scale-up of the TED Prize's mission, The Audacious Project will increase impact by many orders of magnitude.The Audacious Project is supported by The Bridgespan Group, but lists many more organizations as its partners, including Virgin Unite and the Gates Foundation. According to TED, the project has helped participants raise $280m USD in funding.

Winners 
Unlike the original TED Prize, The Audacious Project awards a number of different winners each year. The nomenclature has also changed from 'winners' to 'Big Ideas'.

References

TED (conference)